The soprano flute (also called a third flute or tierce flute) is a type of flute, a musical instrument in the woodwind family. It is pitched in E, a minor third above the concert flute, and is one of the few members of the modern flute family that is not pitched in C or G. The pitch was set at a time such flutes substituted for the E-flat clarinet.

The instrument is now rare. A few American publications for flute choir currently include a part for E (soprano) flute. In these publications, an alternative part is provided either for the C flute or for the piccolo. With the substitution of one of these more common instruments, however, the distinctive colour of a treble flute sound is missing.

Soprano flutes have also been made in F, sounding a perfect fourth higher than the concert flute.

References

Side-blown flutes